Kicks United Football Club is a football club based in The Valley, Anguilla. It competes in the AFA Senior Male League, the top flight of Anguillan football.

History

Winning the treble- the league, the League Cup, and the Knockout Cup in 2014–15, Kicks United unilaterally decided to withdraw from the 2015–16 season in protest with the Anguilla Football Association's constant refusal to recognize their application for club membership.

References

Football clubs in Anguilla
The Valley, Anguilla
AFA Senior Male League clubs